Inspector Chen may refer to:

 Chief Inspector Chen Cao, a fictional character by Qiu Xiaolong
 Detective Inspector Chen, a fictional character by Liz Williams